Spreydon is a suburb of Christchurch, New Zealand,  south-south-west of Cathedral Square. The most central street through Spreydon is Barrington Street. Spreydon is flanked by the suburbs Hoon Hay, Sydenham, and Lower Cashmere. State Highway 76 marks the northern boundary of the suburb, including the eastern end of the Christchurch Southern Motorway.

Spreydon was constituted as a borough in 1911. It merged into the city of Christchurch in 1921.

History
Prior to European settlement, the Spreydon area was predominantly swampland connected to the nearby Ōpāwaho / Heathcote River, interspersed with fields of tussock. The area was first settled by Europeans in 1853, when 300 hectares of land bordering on Lincoln Road were purchased by Augustus Moore, who gave it the name Spreydon Farm. The origins of this name are disputed, with some claiming it refers to family land in Ireland and others that it is named after a place in Devonshire known to Moore. Moore farmed the land and ran a brewery and tavern, known as the Spreydon Arms, on his land along Lincoln Road until 1865, when he sold his property to William Sefton Moorhouse. A baptist church was soon established in the area, built out of a former sod house on land donated by a neighbouring farmer by Thomas Jefcoate. The church's congregation steadily grew as more people settled the area, and continues to operate to this day.

In 1911, the area was constituted as a borough with its own council to reflect the growing population of the area. By this point, the former property had been heavily subdivided with several large roads through the area. The borough continued for roughly a decade, before it was incorporated into the larger Christchurch City Council in 1921.

Demographics

Spreydon had a population of 9,207 at the 2018 New Zealand census, an increase of 483 people (5.5%) since the 2013 census, and an increase of 708 people (8.3%) since the 2006 census. There were 3,732 households. There were 4,515 males and 4,698 females, giving a sex ratio of 0.96 males per female, with 1,620 people (17.6%) aged under 15 years, 2,055 (22.3%) aged 15 to 29, 4,311 (46.8%) aged 30 to 64, and 1,227 (13.3%) aged 65 or older.

Ethnicities were 80.8% European/Pākehā, 12.3% Māori, 4.2% Pacific peoples, 11.3% Asian, and 2.6% other ethnicities (totals add to more than 100% since people could identify with multiple ethnicities).

The proportion of people born overseas was 22.5%, compared with 27.1% nationally.

Although some people objected to giving their religion, 50.9% had no religion, 35.6% were Christian, 1.7% were Hindu, 0.8% were Muslim, 0.8% were Buddhist and 2.9% had other religions.

Of those at least 15 years old, 1,827 (24.1%) people had a bachelor or higher degree, and 1,359 (17.9%) people had no formal qualifications. The employment status of those at least 15 was that 4,122 (54.3%) people were employed full-time, 1,059 (14.0%) were part-time, and 270 (3.6%) were unemployed.

Facilities

 Barrington Shopping Centre, Redeveloped in 2012 houses many shops including a major supermarket, pharmacy, The Warehouse, banks and post office as well as a number of other boutique and lifestyle stores.
Pioneer Leisure Centre, opened in 1978, is a council-owned and operated centre with swimming pools, an indoor sports stadium and a fitness centre.

Education

Christchurch South Karamata Intermediate School is an intermediate school for years 7 to 8 with a roll of  students. It opened in 1939.

Te Kura o Mōkihi Spreydon School opened as Upper Heathcote School in 1865 and Te Ara Koropiko West Spreydon School opened in 1926.

Te Kura Kaupapa Māori o Te Whānau Tahi is a composite school for years 1 to 15 teaching entirely in the Māori language. It has a roll of  students. It started in 1989.

All of these are coeducational state schools. Rolls are as of

References

External links

 Pioneer Leisure Centre

Suburbs of Christchurch